Xiang Lanxin (b. 1956) is a Chinese scholar of international relations and the history of modern China. His work focuses on history and security in East Asia, and on Chinese governance and democracy.

Early life and career 
Xiang was born in Nanjing, Jiangsu in 1956. He attended college at Fudan University in Shanghai before moving to the United States to earn an MA and PhD from the Johns Hopkins School of Advanced International Studies in 1990. He began serving as a professor of International History and Politics Graduate Institute of International and Development Studies in Geneva, Switzerland in 1996. Xiang has spent the majority of his career working outside of China, though he still maintains Chinese citizenship.

Views
Xiang falls within the liberal spectrum of Chinese political thinkers. He considers himself patriotic, but is also critical of the ruling Communist Party of China (CCP) and believes the country should embrace democracy. In his book The Quest for Legitimacy in Chinese Politics, a New Interpretation he compared CCP leadership to the tsars of Russia leading up to the Bolshevik Revolution, "with charlatans and sycophants running amuck." Xiang is also highly critical of Montesquieu and his view of democracy, which he sees as racialist and ignorant of China's historical structures of power and governance. Xiang instead advocates a view of democracy informed by Confucianism and direct democracy. 

Xiang argues that China had a relatively stable system of governance pilloried by many European thinkers—such as Montesquieu, Marx, Hegel, and Adam Smith—who understood Asia only as a negative example, unworthy of study in its own right.

Xiang is critical of "Wolf Warrior diplomacy", the moniker given to more aggressive and confrontational diplomatic behavior by the People's Republic of China in the 21st century, which he considers unproductive and the result of influence Martin Jacques' book When China Rules the World.

References 

Liberalism in China
Chinese historians
Chinese political philosophers
Fudan University alumni
1956 births
Johns Hopkins University people
Academic staff of the Graduate Institute of International and Development Studies
Living people